Renaissance Square is a high-rise complex located in downtown Phoenix, Arizona. Although a part of the same complex, Tower 1 was completed in 1986 while Tower 2 was completed in 1990. Renaissance Square, which is composed of buildings which stand as the seventh- and fourteenth-tallest buildings in Phoenix, is entirely an office complex. The two towers are connected by a skyway positioned halfway up the structures.

It was the second-largest commercial exchange in Phoenix in 2007. In December, 2016 Oaktree Capital Management & Cypress Office Properties purchased the towers from Hines for US$150 million. In late 2017 the project underwent over US$50 million in building renovations. Cushman & Wakefield has the listing assignment to lease the project.

See also
List of tallest buildings in Phoenix

References

Office buildings completed in 1986
Office buildings completed in 1990
Hines Interests Limited Partnership
Skyscraper office buildings in Phoenix, Arizona
Twin towers